Army Headquarters may refer to 

 Army Headquarters (Pakistan)
 Army Headquarters (Sri Lanka)
 Army Headquarters (United Kingdom)
 Army Headquarters (Australia)